Osvaldo Mariño (19 July 1923 – 20 September 2007) was a Uruguayan water polo player. He competed in the men's tournament at the 1948 Summer Olympics.

References

1923 births
2007 deaths
Uruguayan male water polo players
Olympic water polo players of Uruguay
Water polo players at the 1948 Summer Olympics
Sportspeople from Montevideo